The C218 Mercedes-Benz CLS is the second generation of the Mercedes CLS-Class range of four-door coupé sedans. The model shares the chassis and most of the technology with the W212 Mercedes E-class (2010) and was produced from 2011 to 2018. The body styles of the range are:

 4-door car (C218)
 5-door shooting brake (X218)

Unlike its predecessor, the C218/X218 CLS can be optioned with all-wheel drive 4MATIC on all models including CLS 63 AMG variants. Mercedes also introduced a new five-door estate version to the CLS lineup, called the CLS Shooting Brake.

The C218 CLS-Class was succeeded by the Mercedes-Benz CLS-Class (C257) in 2018.

Development and launch 
The design of the C218 CLS is based on the F800 Style concept car unveiled by Mercedes-Benz at the 2009 Geneva Motor Show. It is a four-door coupé featuring a new COMAND interface utilizing a touchpad, design cues inspired by the Mercedes SLS AMG, and sliding rear doors. The production version C218 CLS was publicly unveiled at the 2010 Paris Motor Show and as with the previous generation, is based on the E-Class platform, utilising the same rear multi-link suspension setup.

Body styles

Sedan (C218) 
Production started in January 2011, with 4MATIC model sales starting later in September.

Shooting Brake (X218) 
The CLS Shooting Brake was announced in June 2012, and is an estate version of the CLS sedan. It is based on the Concept Shooting Brake unveiled at Auto China 2010. Shooting Brake models went on sale from October 2012, and are available alongside sedan models in all-wheel drive and AMG variants. It is currently not sold in the United States. It is the most expensive serial production station wagon in the world since year 1992.

Equipment 
Standard equipment includes bi-xenon headlights, 18-inch alloy wheels, dual zone automatic climate control, power sunroof, and satellite navigation with a 10GB hard-drive. Standard safety equipment consists of anti-lock brakes, electronic stability control, active head restraints, and 10 total front, side, and knee airbags. CLS models also come with driver fatigue detection and lane departure warning system functions as standard. Available options include Mercedes' AIRMATIC air suspension, traffic sign recognition, and a reversing camera in conjunction with the COMAND APS system.

Models

Petrol engines

Diesel engines 

*The designation "d" replaces "BlueTEC" for the 2015 model year

CLS 63 AMG 

The CLS 63 AMG is a high performance variant of the CLS and went on sale in March 2011. Standard equipment includes an AMG SPEEDSHIFT MCT 7-speed transmission, a  wider front track, larger 360 mm ventilated and perforated brake discs, an AMG sports exhaust system, and a three-spoke AMG Performance steering wheel with shift paddles. The CLS 63 AMG is available in both sedan and Shooting Brake variants, as well as in rear-wheel drive or 4MATIC all-wheel drive configurations.

Other additions include Edition 1 insignia, matte exterior paintwork, designo leather, and a choice of three AMG exclusive interior trim.

The Performance Package was also replaced by the new CLS 63 AMG S model, featuring further performance and efficiency enhancements, all-wheel drive 4MATIC as standard, and a rear locking differential. It is also available as a Shooting Brake variant and launched in June 2013.

Model year changes

2014 facelift 
A facelift was introduced for the CLS model range in 2014.

The major changes are:

 A redesigned front fascia with a diamond-patterned radiator grille (for AMG package models) and new anti-dazzle MULTIBEAM LED headlights 
 Tail lights in slightly darker shade of red 
 Interior changes including a new steering wheel design and a larger free standing 8-inch COMAND APS display 
 New model naming scheme for diesel engines (CLS 350 BlueTEC now called CLS 350d)
 Introduction of CLS 400 and CLS 220d models, and updated CLS 350d engine
 Introduction of 9G-TRONIC nine-speed automatic transmission on all models (excluding the CLS 400)

2016 
 CLS 400 receives 9-speed automatic transmission
CLS 500 receives iron lined cylinder bores instead of plasma honed aluminium.

Sales figures 
As with the previous generation, the CLS sedan and Shooting Brake models are produced in Sindelfingen, Germany.

The following are the sales figures for the C218 CLS in Europe only:

Awards 
 2010 Auto Bild 'Golden Steering Wheel Award'
 2010 Auto Zeitung 'Best Car of the Year' (luxury segment)
 2011 auto motor und sport 'Autonis Awards'
 2011 Automotive Brand Contest 'Best of Best' (exterior category)
 2013 Auto Zeitung Design Award for the CLS Shooting Brake
 2016 cars.com 'Luxury Car of the Year'

References 

CLS-Class
Rear-wheel-drive vehicles
Luxury vehicles
2000s cars
2010s cars
Cars introduced in 2011
Sports sedans
Coupés